The Allied Democratic Forces (abbreviated ADF) is an Islamist rebel group in Uganda and the Democratic Republic of the Congo (DRC), considered a terrorist organisation by the Ugandan government. It was originally based in western Uganda but has expanded into the neighbouring DRC.

Since the late 1990s, the ADF has operated in the DRC's North Kivu province near the border with Uganda. While repeated military offensives against the ADF have severely affected it, the ADF has been able to regenerate because its recruitment and financial networks have remained intact. Some of the attacks it has been blamed for also appear to have been committed by other rebel groups as well as the Congolese Armed Forces.

From 2015, the ADF experienced a radicalisation after the imprisonment of its leader Jamil Mukulu and the rise of Musa Baluku in his place. From 2019, the ADF had split, with one part remaining loyal to Mukulu, while the other had merged into the Islamic State's Central Africa Province under Baluku.

History

Establishment

The ADF was formed as merger of several rebel factions, including the Allied Democratic Movement, the National Army for the Liberation of Uganda (NALU), the Uganda Muslim Liberation Army, and militant members of the Tablighi Jamaat movement.  The main figure of the group was Jamil Mukulu, a former Catholic who converted to Islam. The members were largely from central Uganda, in particular Iganga, Masaka, and Kampala, and portray themselves as religious crusaders.

Beyond this vaguely stated religious ideology and statements that the government discriminates against Tablighis, the ADF has given few coherent rationales for their insurgency. The ADF chose western Uganda apparently for three reasons: terrain that is ideal for a rural insurgency, proximity to the DRC where the rebels could set up bases and recruit fighters, and the presence of some Ugandan ethnic groups unfriendly to the government that could offer assistance. It received support from the government of Sudan, which was engaged in disputes with the government of Uganda.

Low-level operations in the early 2000s 
Since the 2000s, the ADF has shown no commitment to its original goal of creating an Islamic state except to use it as a narrative to unite its members. By the late 2000s, its leaders had ceased making public proclamations, avoided media and harshly punished runaways. With their methods, the leadership managed to minimize any interactions that might reveal its objectives and activities. This worked to their advantage, allowing them to survive despite repeated military attacks.

While in-depth research explores the group's early years in Uganda, there has been hardly any in-depth academic analysis on its activities since it resurfaced in the Congo in 2010. Per Kristof Titeca, the lack of knowledge has also been exploited by some political players to craft the narratives for their own objectives. In general, the group increasingly intermingled with the local population during this time, with many fighters marrying locals.

During March 2007, the Uganda People's Defence Force (UPDF) engaged incursive ADF groups in multiple firefights, killing at least 46 in Bundibugyo and Mubende districts. The biggest battle occurred on 27 March, when the UPDF faced an estimated 60 ADF troops, killing 34, including three senior commanders. The UPDF claimed to have retrieved numerous weapons as well as documents that tied the ADF to the Lord's Resistance Army (LRA).

On 13 April 2007, the UPDF and ADF engaged in an intense battle inside the Semuliki National Park, near the upscale Semliki Lodge tourist destination.

Ceasefire and amnesty talks between the government of Uganda and the ADF were held in Nairobi starting in May 2008. Negotiations were complicated by the fragmentation of the ADF's leadership. Non-combatant dependents of the ADF were repatriated to Uganda by the International Organization for Migration (IOM). At least 48 ADF fighters surrendered and were given amnesty. As the threat from the LRA in the DRC waned, the UPDF put increasing focus on the ADF as a reason for UPDF personnel to remain in the DRC.

2013 resurgence and radicalisation 
From 2011 to 2013, several hundreds of people were kidnapped in Beni, some by ADF and some by other armed groups. In April 2013, it was reported that ADF started a recruitment campaign in Kampala and other parts of the country. Citing a defector from ADF, AllAfrica.com reported that approximately ten new recruits joined ADF forces every day. In July 2013, the ADF renewed its fighting in the Congolese district of Beni. According to the UN Radio Okapi, the ADF together with the NALU fought a pitched battle with the Military of the Democratic Republic of the Congo (FARDC), briefly taking the towns of Mamundioma and Totolito. On 11 July, the ADF attacked the town of Kamango, triggering the flight of over 60,000 refugees across the border into the Ugandan district of Bundibugyo.

Early in September 2013, regional leaders under the International Conference on the Great Lakes Region (ICGLR) asked the recently formed combative United Nations Force Intervention Brigade under the United Nations Organization Stabilization Mission in the Democratic Republic of the Congo to attack positions of foreign negative forces operating in the DRC, including the ADF. In late September 2013, 3 people were killed and 30 abducted during an ADF attack in the Watalinga Sector, North Kivu, DRC. Omar Kavota, the vice president and spokesman of the local civil society in North Kivu, condemned the abductions. According to the civil society, the abductees included eight minors.

In January 2014, the FARDC launched a major offensive against ADF forces in Beni. By April, Mukulu and other senior leaders of the group fled their headquarters camp from approaching FARDC forces. The remaining ADF fighters– alongside women and children – retreated into the forest, where their numbers were significantly reduced in the following months as a result of starvation, desertion, and continued FARDC attacks. Mukulu and others moved into exile. From this point onwards, the ADF fell under the control of the old second-in-command Musa Baluku. Under his leadership, the ADF became increasingly radical and brutal in its operations, launching more attacks on civilians.

From October to December 2014, 250 people were killed for which ADF was solely blamed by the DRC government and MONUSCO. The Congo Research Group however stated that FARDC soldiers, former members of RCD–K/ML as well as members of communal militias were also involved. From December 2014 to January 2015, three Muslim clerics were killed by unknown assailants. Six alleged ADF members were arrested. However, the government did not show any evidence for ADF links. On 30 March 2015, an Ugandan government spokesman had initially blamed ADF and then al-Shabaab for assassination of government prosecutor Joan Kagezi, without offering evidence in either case. In late April 2015, the ADF's leader, Jamil Mukulu, was arrested in Tanzania. In July 2015, he was extradited to Uganda. Despite Mukulu's attempts to keep influencing the ADF from prison, Musa Baluku consequently cemented his power and moved the ADF closer to international jihadism.

As of November 2015, the number of attacks on Congolese forces continued, with weekly attacks of varying size taking place and killing more than 400 people in 2015, especially in the territories of Beni (North Kivu) and Irumu (Ituri). The ADF have been blamed for the 2016 Beni massacre and also for an attack in North Kivu on 7 December 2017, which killed 15 UN peacekeepers, all Tanzanians, as well as 5 Congolese soldiers.

Split and Baluku's allegiance to ISIL 
From 2017, ADF elements began to forge connections to the Islamic State of Iraq and the Levant (ISIL). In June 2019, an ISIL propaganda video showed Musa Baluku pledging allegiance to ISIL. A "major faction" of the ADF joined Baluku, but a group of Mukulu loyalists opposed to this course consequently split off. The splinter faction was believed to be small, counting 10 to 30 fighters as well as their followers, and to be led by a man known as "Muzaaya". Muzaaya had previously served as a commander for ADF's southern division, the "Mwalika camp"; his splinter was believed to be based along the Semliki River in the Virunga National Park. Muzaaya's group included at least one senior commander, Benjamin Kisokeranio, and was rumoured to enjoy support from Mukulu's son Hassan Nyanzi who is based in South Africa. The ADF's international support network was also affected by the split; several attempt to stay neutral and declare no allegiance to either the Mukulu loyalists or Baluku's followers.

The Armed Forces of the Democratic Republic of the Congo (FARDC) conducted large-scale operations from late 2019 to late 2020 that greatly weakened the ADF, killing hundreds of its fighters. According to the International Crisis Group, the ADF completely splintered during these operations, and the rival factions also distanced themselves from each other geographically. Some ADF elements moved to the Rwenzori Mountains, while others had relocated into Ituri Province where they attacked civilians. Despite these setbacks, ADF forces have been associated with 800 deaths and a prison escape in 2020 in the Democratic Republic of the Congo. In 2020, Baluku claimed that the ADF had ceased to exist and was succeeded by the Islamic State's Central Africa Province.

Foreign involvement
The DRC government, citing civil society groups in North Kivu, says that Al-Shabaab fighters from Somalia are collaborating with the ADF. Uganda has claimed that there is a link between them with al-Shabaab and al-Qaeda. In-depth reports have denied this link, stating that there is contact but not real integration. MONUSCO has accused it of having extensive links to international Islamist terrorist groups such as al-Qaeda, al-Shabab, Hezbollah, al-Qaeda in the Maghreb, Boko Haram and Taliban. 

The Washington Post and World Policy Institute however have considered MONUSCO's single source as dubious. In 2010, the group claimed an attack in the Ugandan capital of Kampala. At least 70 people who had assembled in public places in Kampala to watch a World Cup soccer game were killed in the attacks.

An Islamic State financier (Waleed Ahmed Zein) is said to have paid the group at least once according to a report of the New York University’s Congo Research Group.

References

Works cited

External links
"Uganda army says troops kill 38 rebel fighters", Reuters, 28 March 2007
GlobalSecurity.org
UGANDA: IRIN Special Report on the ADF rebellion IRIN, 8 December 1999
IDP numbers by the Global IDP Database
  Opportunities and Constraints for the Disarmament and Repatriation of Foreign Armed Groups in the Democratic Republic of Congo (with link to report, PowerPoint and video of presentation by Hans Romkema and Steve Bradley) Woodrow Wilson International Center for Scholars, September 2007, in particular p. 12

 
1996 establishments in Uganda
Factions of the First Congo War
Factions of the Second Congo War
Islamic terrorism in Africa
Islamist insurgent groups
Organizations based in Africa designated as terrorist
Rebel groups in the Democratic Republic of the Congo
Rebel groups in Uganda